In linguistics, declension (verb: to decline) is the changing of the form of a word, generally to express its syntactic function in the sentence, by way of some inflection. Declensions may apply to nouns, pronouns, adjectives, adverbs, and articles to indicate number (e.g. singular, dual, plural), case (e.g. nominative case, accusative case, genitive case, dative case), gender (e.g. masculine, neuter, feminine), and a number of other grammatical categories. Meanwhile, the inflectional change of verbs is called conjugation.

Declension occurs in many of the world's languages. It is an important aspect of language families like Quechuan (i.e., languages native to the Andes), Indo-European (e.g. German, Lithuanian, Latvian, Slavic, Sanskrit, Latin, Ancient Greek, Modern Greek, Classical Armenian and Modern Armenian and Kurdish), Bantu (e.g. Zulu, Kikuyu), Semitic (e.g. Modern Standard Arabic), Finno-Ugric (e.g. Hungarian, Finnish, Estonian), and Turkic (e.g. Turkish).

Old English was an inflectional language, but largely abandoned inflectional changes as it evolved into Modern English. Though traditionally classified as synthetic, Modern English has moved towards an analytic language.

History 
It is agreed that Ancient Greeks had a "vague" idea of the forms of a noun in their language. A fragment of Anacreon seems to confirm this idea. Nevertheless, it cannot be concluded that the Ancient Greeks actually knew what the cases were. The Stoics developed many basic notions that today are the rudiments of linguistics. The idea of grammatical cases is also traced back to the Stoics, but it's still not completely clear what the Stoics exactly meant with their notion of cases.

English-speaking perspective

Unlike English, many languages use suffixes to specify subjects and objects and word cases in general. Inflected languages have a freer word order than modern English, an analytic language in which word order identifies the subject and object. As an example, even though both of the following sentences consist of the same words, the meaning is different:

 "The dog chased a cat."
 "A cat chased the dog."

Hypothetically speaking, suppose English were a language with a more complex declension system in which cases were formed by adding the suffixes:

 - (for nominative singular), - (genitive), - (dative), - (accusative), - (locative), - (instrumental), - (vocative), - (ablative)

The above sentence could be formed with any of the following word orders and would have the same meaning:

As a more complex example, the sentence: 
 Mum, this little boy's dog was chasing a cat down our street!
becomes nonsensical in English if the words are rearranged (because there are no cases):
 A cat, mum, our street down was chasing dog this little boy's!

But if English were a highly inflected language, like Latin or some Slavic languages such as Croatian, both sentences could mean the same thing. They would both contain five nouns in five different cases:  mum – vocative (hey!), dog – nominative (who?),  boy – genitive (of whom?), cat – accusative (whom?),  street – locative (where?); the adjective little would be in the same case as the noun it modifies (boy), and the case of the determiner our would agree with the case of the noun it determines (street).

Using the case suffixes invented for this example, the original sentence would read:
 ,     was chasing a  down  !

And like other inflected languages, the sentence rearranged in the following ways would mean virtually the same thing, but with different expressiveness:

 Down    was chasing    , !

Instead of the locative, the instrumental form of "down our street" could also be used:
 ,       was chasing a !

 A  was,     chasing    

    was chasing    , !

Thus it is demonstrated how different word orders preserving the original meaning are possible in an inflected language, while modern English relies on word order for meaning (but with a little flexibility). This is one of the advantages of an inflected language. The English sentences above, when read without the made-up case suffixes, are confusing.

These contrived examples are relatively simple, whereas actual inflected languages have a far more complicated set of declensions, where the suffixes (or prefixes, or infixes) change depending on the gender of the noun, the quantity of the noun, and other possible factors. This complexity and the possible lengthening of words is one of the disadvantages of inflected languages. Notably, many of these languages lack articles. There may also be irregular nouns where the declensions are unique for each word (like irregular verbs with conjugation). In inflected languages, other parts of speech such as numerals, demonstratives, adjectives, and articles are also declined.

Modern English

In Modern English, the system of declensions is so simple compared to some other languages that the term declension is rarely used.

Nouns
Most nouns in English have distinct singular and plural forms. Nouns and most noun phrases can form a possessive construction. Plurality is most commonly shown by the ending -s (or -es), whereas possession is always shown by the enclitic -'s or, for plural forms ending in s, by just an apostrophe.

Consider, for example, the forms of the noun girl. Most speakers pronounce all forms other than the singular plain form (girl) exactly the same.

By contrast, a few irregular nouns (like man/men) are slightly more complex in their forms. In this example, all four forms are pronounced distinctly.

For nouns, in general, gender is not declined in Modern English. There are isolated situations where certain nouns may be modified to reflect gender, though not in a systematic fashion. Loan words from other languages, particularly Latin and the Romance languages, often preserve their gender-specific forms in English, e.g. alumnus (masculine singular) and alumna (feminine singular). Similarly, names borrowed from other languages show comparable distinctions: Andrew and Andrea, Paul and Paula, etc. Additionally, suffixes such as -ess, -ette, and -er are sometimes applied to create overtly gendered versions of nouns, with marking for feminine being much more common than marking for masculine. Many nouns can actually function as members of two genders or even all three, and the gender classes of English nouns are usually determined by their agreement with pronouns, rather than marking on the nouns themselves.

There can be other derivations from nouns that are not considered declensions. For example, the proper noun Britain has the associated descriptive adjective British and the demonym Briton. Though these words are clearly related, and are generally considered cognates, they are not specifically treated as forms of the same word, and thus are not declensions.

Pronouns
Pronouns in English have more complex declensions. For example, the first person "I":

Whereas nouns do not distinguish between the subjective (nominative) and objective (oblique) cases, some pronouns do; that is, they decline to reflect their relationship to a verb or preposition, or case. Consider the difference between he (subjective) and him (objective), as in "He saw it" and "It saw him"; similarly, consider who, which is subjective, and the objective whom (although it is increasingly common to use who for both).

The one situation where gender is still clearly part of the English language is in the pronouns for the third person singular. Consider the following:

The distinguishing of neuter for persons and non-persons is peculiar to English. This has existed since the 14th century. However, the use of singular they is often restricted to specific contexts, depending on the dialect or the speaker. It is most typically used to refer to a single person of unknown gender (e.g. "someone left their jacket behind") or a hypothetical person where gender is insignificant (e.g. "If someone wants to, then they should"). Its use has expanded in recent years due to increasing social recognition of persons who do not identify themselves as male or female. (see gender-nonbinary) Note that the singular they still uses plural verb forms, reflecting its origins.

Adjectives and adverbs
Some English adjectives and adverbs are declined for degree of comparison. The unmarked form is the positive form, such as quick. Comparative forms are formed with the ending -er (quicker), while superlative forms are formed with -est (quickest). Some are uncomparable; the remainder are usually periphrastic constructions with more (more beautiful) and most (most modestly). See degree of comparison for more.

Adjectives are not declined for case in Modern English (though they were in Old English), nor number nor gender.

Determiners
The demonstrative determiners this and that are declined for number, as these and those. 

The article is never regarded as declined in Modern English, although formally, the words that and possibly she correspond to forms of the predecessor of the (sē m., þæt n., sēo f.) as it was declined in Old English.

Latin

Just as verbs in Latin are conjugated to indicate grammatical information, Latin nouns and adjectives that modify them are declined to signal their roles in sentences. There are five important cases for Latin nouns: nominative, genitive, dative, accusative, and ablative. Since the vocative case usually takes the same form as the nominative, it is seldom spelt out in grammar books. Yet another case, the locative, is limited to a small number of words.

The usual basic functions of these cases are as follows:
Nominative case indicates the subject.
Genitive case indicates possession and can be translated with ‘of’.
Dative case marks the indirect object and can be translated with ‘to’ or ‘for’.
Accusative case marks the direct object.
Ablative case is used to modify verbs and can be translated as ‘by’, ‘with’, ‘from’, etc.
Vocative case is used to address a person or thing.

The genitive, dative, accusative, and ablative also have important functions to indicate the object of a preposition.

Given below is the declension paradigm of Latin puer ‘boy’ and puella ‘girl’:

From the provided examples we can see how cases work:

 liber puerī → the book of the boy (puerī boy=genitive)
 puer puellae rosam dat → the boy gives the girl a rose (puer boy=nominative; puellae girl=dative; rosam rose=accusative; dat give=third person singular present)

Sanskrit

Sanskrit, another Indo-European language, has eight cases: nominative, vocative, accusative, genitive, dative, ablative, locative and instrumental. Some do not count vocative as a separate case, despite it having a distinctive ending in the singular, but consider it as a different use of the nominative.

Sanskrit grammatical cases have been analyzed extensively. The grammarian Pāṇini identified six semantic roles or karaka, which correspond closely to the eight cases:
 agent (related to the nominative)
 patient (related to the accusative)
 means (related to the instrumental)
 recipient (related to the dative)
 source (related to the ablative)
relation (related to genitive)
 locus (related to the locative)
 address (related to the vocative)
For example, consider the following sentence:

Here leaf is the agent, tree is the source, and ground is the locus. The endings -aṁ, -at, -āu mark the cases associated with these meanings.

Declension in specific languages
Albanian declension
Arabic ʾIʿrab
Basque declension
Hindi declension

Greek and Latin 
Ancient Greek and Latin First declension
Ancient Greek and Latin Second declension
Ancient Greek and Latin Third declension
Greek declension
Latin declension

Celtic languages 
Irish declension

Germanic languages 
Dutch declension system
German declension
Gothic declension
Icelandic declension
Middle English declension

Baltic languages 
Latvian declension
Lithuanian declension

Slavic languages 
Bosnian, Croatian, Montenegrin and Serbian declension
Czech declension
Polish declension
Russian declension
Slovak declension
Slovene declension
Ukrainian declension

Uralic languages 
Finnish language noun cases

See also
 Grammatical conjugation
 Grammatical case
 Strong inflection
 Weak inflection

Notes and references

Notes

Citations

External links

The Status of Morphological Case in the Icelandic Lexicon by Eiríkur Rögnvaldsson. Discussion of whether cases convey any inherent syntactic or semantic meaning.
Optimal Case: The Distribution of Case in German and Icelandic by Dieter Wunderlich

 Lexicon of Linguistics: Declension
 Lexicon of Linguistics: Base, Stem, Root
 Lexicon of Linguistics: Defective Paradigm
 Lexicon of Linguistics: Strong Verb
 Lexicon of Linguistics: Inflection Phrase (IP), INFL, AGR, Tense
 Lexicon of Linguistics: Lexicalist Hypothesis
classical Greek declension

 
Grammatical cases
Grammar
Linguistic morphology
Linguistics terminology